Terowongan Casablanca (The Casablanca Tunnel) is a 2007 Indonesian horror film written by Faldhin Martha and directed by Nanang Istiabudi.

Background
The film is (loosely) based upon an Indonesian legend that the Casablanca Tunnel in Jakarta is haunted by a woman who went there in the 1970s to attempt an abortion, was unsuccessful, and died as a result.

Plot
Refa and Astari have been a couple for a year, Astari becomes pregnant. An angry Refa lures her the Casablanca Tunnel to force an abortion, and in an attempt to flee, Astari is captured and buried alive with her unborn child. Astari returns as a vengeful ghost known as Pontianak to seek revenge on Refa and his friends.

Cast
 Donny Arifin
 Ki Joko Bodo
 Nino Fernandez
 Jupiter Fortissimo
 Titi Qadarsih
 Ardina Rasti
 Ray Sahetapy
 Asha Shara
 Aldiansyah Taher
 Five Vi

Reception
Slasherpool found the film unintentionally hilarious for its poor quality and the amateurish manner of its attempt to be a serious horror film when they offered "I haven't laughed this hard in a long time. It's only unfortunate that Terowongan Casablanca wasn't intended to be funny." The reviewer panned the film as a horror, noting its sub-par sound quality, poor choices of effects, bad cinematography, bad acting, poor editing, and extreme overuse of "scary" effects, writing "they didn't have enough
money to do great special effects, so instead they
crammed countless of cheap effects in every scene", "bad editing can also be blamed for the ridiculous amount of loud scare noises
that have been crammed into every single frame of the movie", "the incompetent director and his frantic camerawork". And of the film inadvertently being a comedy, "This is the funniest horror movie I've seen in a long time but at the same time the most atrocious one in recent memory. I can't believe people are allowed to make movies this bad", and "If you're looking for a movie so bad that you won't be able to avoid laughing through the entire thing,
Terowongan Casablanca is the movie for you."

Influences
The novel Terowongan Casablanca by Ruwi Meita, was written based upon the Faldin Martha screenplay . The book is now in libraries throughout Indonesia, and archived by Cornell University in its Asia Collection.

References

External links
 "Terowongan Casablanca" at TheBestMovieReview.com
 

2007 horror films
2007 films
Films shot in Indonesia
Indonesian horror films
Indonesian ghost films